Natko Zrnčić-Dim (born 7 March 1986) is a Croatian alpine ski coach and retired World Cup skier. He won a bronze medal in super combined at the World Championships in 2009 at Val-d'Isère, France, and is a member of SK Medveščak.

Born in Zagreb, SR Croatia, SFR Yugoslavia, Zrnčić-Dim's best World Cup result is second place in a super combined, achieved on 30 January 2011 in Chamonix, France. Compatriot Ivica Kostelić won that race, his seventh of the month, and marked the first time that Croatians finished first and second in a World Cup race. Zrnčić-Dim incurred shoulder injury in a super-G at Beaver Creek in early December 2012, which ended his 2013 season. Through mid-January 2014, he has five World Cup podiums, all in combined events. He is one of rare downhill specialists who was able to qualify into second run of slalom. He has done it three times; all were in Wengen, having best result of 18th place in 2010.

In 2019 he announced his retirement from active competing, due to unsuccessful comeback after injury in November 2016. His last World Cup race was a combined in Bansko on 22 February 2019. Since the start of 2019/20 season, he coaches Rea Hraski to prepare for the 2019 Winter Deaflympics.

World Cup results

Season standings

Race podiums

 5 podiums – 5 AC (4 SC, 1 K)

Results per discipline

 standings through 25 Nov 2018

World Championship results

Olympic results

References

External links
 
 Natko Zrnčić-Dim World Cup standings at the International Ski Federation
 
 
 Croatian Ski Team – official site 
 Atomic Skis – athletes – Natko Zrnčić-Dim

1986 births
Croatian male alpine skiers
Alpine skiers at the 2006 Winter Olympics
Alpine skiers at the 2010 Winter Olympics
Alpine skiers at the 2014 Winter Olympics
Alpine skiers at the 2018 Winter Olympics
Olympic alpine skiers of Croatia
Sportspeople from Zagreb
Living people